Tim Janis is an American composer with 10 Billboard charting CDs, over one million albums sold, five television specials, and a constant touring presence.

Career

On 30 November 2012, Janis produced "The American Christmas Carol" concert for Kate Winslet’s Golden Hat Foundation supported by Sarah McLachlan, Loreena McKennitt, Andrea Corr, Hayley Westenra, Sleepy Man Banjo Boys, an orchestra, and a choir in Carnegie Hall. He produced similar concerts for 2013 and 2014. In 2018, he directed the musical movie Buttons, whose proceeds benefit The Golden Hat Foundation.

Selected discography 
 Ghost Town (1992)
 Along the Shore of Acadia (1996)
 Etain (1996)
 Christmas (1999)
 December Morning (1999)
 Flowers in October (1999)
 Water's Edge (2000)
 American Composer in Concert (2001)
 Music of Hope (2001)
 Thousand Summers (2002)
 Flowers in October [bonus DVD] (2003)
 Across Two Oceans (2003)
 Beautiful America (2003)
 American Horizons (2005)
 Christmas Piano Collection (2005)
 Simple Gift of Christmas (2003)
 Coming Home (2005)
 Promise (2005)
 Winter's Eve (2005)
 Coastal America (2006)
 Quiet Shore (2006)
 Wondrous Christmas (2006)
 The American Christmas Carol (2006)
 Gifts of the Heart (2007)
 An Enchanted Evening (2008)
 Celebrate America (2009)
 The Journey Home (2010)

Public television specials 
 Tim Janis: Celebrate America MONTANA (2010), with 14 Montana High School Choral groups across Montana.
 Tim Janis: An American Composer in Concert (2002)
 Tim Janis: Beautiful America (narrated by George Clooney) (2004)
 Tim Janis: Coastal America (narrated by George Clooney) (2006)
 Tim Janis: The American Christmas Carol (narrated by James Earl Jones) (2006)
 Tim Janis: An Enchanted Evening (2007)
 Tim Janis: Celtic Heart (2019)

References

External links
 
 UNH Magazine Spring 01--Alumni profiles
 

Living people
American male composers
21st-century American composers
New-age musicians
People from York, Maine
21st-century American male musicians
Year of birth missing (living people)